Alfredo Javaloyes López (March 22, 1865 - February 18, 1944 ) was a Spanish musician. His best known work is the military march El Abanico ("The Fan"), composed in the year 1910.

Javaloyes Lopez was born in 1865 in the town of Elche, Province of Alicante, Spain. The street where he was born now bears his name. He studied music in Barcelona in 1880 with the composers Fabio Campano and Felip Pedrell. A streetcar accident permanently disabled his left hand, ending his performing career. With the support of Pedrell, he studied to become a military music director. In 1901, he became music director to the Sevilla Regiment 33 in Cartagena. He remained in that city until 1918, when he became director of Música del Batallón de Cazadores of Barbastro. When he retired from military life, he returned to his hometown of Elche, where he served as Director of the Municipal Band. before his death in 1944.

References

1865 births
1944 deaths
Male conductors (music)
March musicians
Military musicians
Musicians with disabilities
People from Elche
Spanish composers
Spanish conductors (music)
Spanish male musicians